Morgan Spurlock's New Britannia is a British satirical entertainment series and talk show hosted by American documentary maker and television presenter Morgan Spurlock. The series takes a comedic look at the differences between British and American culture, focusing on a number of key areas including food, sport, class and fame. Each episode he is joined by a selection of guests from both sides of the Atlantic who offer their input on the subject.

The series debuted on Sky Atlantic and Sky Atlantic HD on 2 April 2012, after Game of Thrones. The first series ran for 10 episodes.

Episodes

Series 1 (2012)

Reception
The show was met with poor reviews.

References

External links

2010s British satirical television series
2010s British television talk shows
2012 British television series debuts
2012 British television series endings
Sky Atlantic original programming
English-language television shows
2010s British documentary television series